Homona polyarcha is a species of moth of the family Tortricidae. It is found in Zimbabwe.

References

Endemic fauna of Zimbabwe
Moths described in 1924
Homona (moth)